Methylpentane may refer to:

 2-Methylpentane
 3-Methylpentane
You could also have been looking for:

 Methylpentenone